Saget is a surname. Notable people with the name include:

People
Bob Saget (1956–2022), American stand-up comedian, actor, and television host
Jean-Marie Saget (1929–2020), French military pilot and test pilot for Dassault Aviation
Jean-Nicolas Nissage Saget (1810–1880), President of Haiti

Characters
Walter Saget, a fictional character from Drawn Together

See also
Sagat (name), given name and surname